Huracán Buceo is a multisports club, best known for its football side, located in Montevideo in Uruguay. In 2009 the team went into a financial crisis and couldn't play anymore in the professional competitions and played further in the amateur leagues. Handball is also a main sport for the club contributing many players to the national team.

Huracán is known as "Tricoplayeros" (a word that joins two senses: three-coloured uniform and the fact that the club was originally based next to the coast of Montevideo).

Ricardo Guero Rodriguez played for the youth team, before continuing his career in Mexico.

Huracán archrivals are Basañez and Villa Española.
The official mascot of the club is Topo Gigio.

Performance in CONMEBOL competitions
Copa Libertadores: 0 appearances
 :

Copa Sudamericana: 0 appearances
 :

Recopa Sudamericana: 0 appearances
 :

Copa CONMEBOL: 1 appearance
1998: Second Round

Titles
Uruguayan Second Division: 2
 1969, 1995

 Divisional Intermedia: 2
 1960, 1967

References

External links
 Official Page (Spanish)

Football clubs in Uruguay
Association football clubs established in 1937
Sport in Montevideo
1937 establishments in Uruguay